Banque Internationale du Bénin (B.I.B.E.) is a national bank of Benin. It is a member of the West African Bankers' Association.

It has its headquarters at Carrefour des 3 Banques in Cotonou but also has branches in Porto-Novo and Parakou. Nigeria dominates the bank, with the First Bank of Nigeria Plc. having a 13.6% share, the  Union Bank of Nigeria Plc. (13%), Nigerian Economic Operatives (47.7%), Nigerian Bureau of Public Enterprises  (6.7%), and then the First Interstate Merchant Bank Ltd. (11.1%) and finally the Beninese Economic Operatives with 8.2%.

References

Banks of Benin
Companies based in Cotonou

 Banque Capitale Du Benin